Heriniavo Rasolonjatovo (born 24 May 1998) is a Malagasy swimmer. He competed in the men's 100 metre backstroke at the 2020 Summer Olympics.

References

External links
 

1998 births
Living people
Malagasy male swimmers
Olympic swimmers of Madagascar
Swimmers at the 2020 Summer Olympics
Place of birth missing (living people)
20th-century Malagasy people
21st-century Malagasy people